The Fighting Sullivans, originally released as The Sullivans, is a 1944 American biographical war film directed by Lloyd Bacon and written by Edward Doherty, Mary C. McCall Jr., and Jules Schermer. It was nominated for a now-discontinued Academy Award for Best Story.

The story retells, with some poetic license, the lives of five Irish-American Sullivan brothers, who grew up in Iowa during the days of the Great Depression and served together in the United States Navy during World War II.

Plot
The Irish-American Catholic Sullivan brothers are introduced through a progression of baptisms: George Thomas in 1914, Francis "Frank" Henry in 1916, Joseph "Joe" Eugene in 1918, Madison "Matt" Abel in 1919, and Albert "Al" Leo in 1922 in their hometown of Waterloo, Iowa. There is also a sister, Genevieve, nicknamed "Gen", making the Sullivans a happy family of eight.

Based on the apparent ages of the boys, the first part of the plot occurs in the late 1920s. As the boys grow, they are doted upon by their mother and Gen and given stern but loving guidance by their father, who is a railroad freight conductor. Each day, the boys climb the water tower by the tracks and wave to their father as he passes by on the train. The brothers are shown getting into their fair share of trouble growing up: a fight, a near drowning (after which their mother makes them promise not to set foot on a boat again until they are adults), and accidentally flooding the kitchen.

By 1939, only Al is still in high school. On the day that George wins a motorcycle race, Al meets Katherine Mary (played by Anne Baxter) an only child who lives with her father. Despite their youth, Al and Katherine Mary fall in love. Believing that Al is too young, his brothers nearly break the couple up, but realize what they have done and apologize. Soon after, Katherine Mary and Al are married, and ten months later, are expecting a baby. Al is fired for taking the afternoon off to escort his wife to the doctor, but his brothers vow to help them out.

Later, months after little Jimmy has been welcomed into the family, the Sullivans are relaxing on a Sunday—December 7, 1941. They hear about the attack on Pearl Harbor on the radio. Al decides that he cannot go with his brothers, due to his family responsibilities, but when Katherine Mary sees his despondent face, she tells him to go with the others to the recruiting station.

The brothers insist that they serve on the same ship, but the recruiting officer, LCDR Robinson (played by Ward Bond), states that the Navy can make no such guarantees. The brothers leave, but later, George receives his draft notice, and writes to the Navy Department, obtaining official permission for the boys to serve together.

Later, Tom, Alleta, and Katherine Mary eagerly await letters from their loved ones, who are serving aboard  in the Pacific. A battle rages off the Solomon Islands, and one day, Juneau is hit. Four of the brothers find each other, then realize that George is below in sick bay. They rush down to get him, the ship continuing to be battered by explosions, and when George insists they leave him behind, Al replies, "We can't go swimming without you." There is a large explosion and the screen fades to black, insinuating that Juneau has been sunk and all the brothers killed.

Soon after, LCDR Robinson visits the Sullivan home and tells Katherine Mary, Tom, Alleta, and Gen that all five of the brothers were killed in action. Stunned, Tom goes to work and salutes the water tower on which his sons used to stand and wave to him.

Sometime later, Tom, Katherine Mary, and Gen, who has joined the WAVES, watch with pride while Alleta christens a new destroyer, . As Tom and Alleta watch the ship sail away, Alleta declares, "Tom, our boys are afloat again."

In actuality, only Frank, Joe, and Matt went down with Juneau when it sank. George and Al managed to make it to a life boat, but Al died the next day. George survived before suffering from delirium as a result of hypernatremia, although some sources say he went mad with the grief of losing his brothers, and four or five days later he slipped quietly out of the raft, never to be seen again.

Cast
 Anne Baxter as Katherine Mary Sullivan
 Thomas Mitchell as Mr. Thomas F. "Tom" Sullivan, the father
 Selena Royle as Mrs. Alleta Sullivan, the mother
 Edward Ryan as Albert Leo "Al" Sullivan
 Trudy Marshall as Genevieve Marie "Gen" Sullivan
 John Campbell as Francis Henry "Frank" Sullivan
 James Cardwell as George Thomas Sullivan
 John Alvin as Madison Abel "Matt" Sullivan
 George Offerman as Joseph Eugene "Joe" Sullivan
 Roy Roberts as Father Francis
 Ward Bond as Lieutenant Commander Robinson
 Bobby Driscoll as young Al Sullivan
 Buddy Swan as young George Sullivan

See also
 List of American films of 1944

Further reading
 The Fighting Sullivans: How Hollywood and the Military Make Heroes by Bruce Kuklick, 2016, University Press of Kansas 
“Left To Die” The tragedy of the USS Juneau. By Dan Kurzman.

References

External links

 
 
 
 

1944 films
20th Century Fox films
American biographical drama films
American black-and-white films
World War II films based on actual events
Films scored by Cyril J. Mockridge
Films set in Iowa
Films directed by Lloyd Bacon
World War II films made in wartime
1940s biographical drama films
1944 drama films
1940s English-language films